These are the squad lists of the teams participating in the 1993 CONCACAF Gold Cup.

Group A

Honduras
Head Coach:  Julio González Montemurro

(N°2)Gustavo Calix DF 04/08/1972 Club Deportivo Petrotela Honduras
(N°15)Victor Orlando Garay DF / /19 Club Deportivo Petrotela Honduras
(N°17)Jose Villatoro Ulloa DF 02/04/1968 Club Deportivo Marathon Honduras
(N°18)Giovanny Gayle Alarcon MF / /19 Club Deportivo Petrotela Honduras

Jamaica
Head coach:  Carl Brown

Panama
Head Coach:  Saúl Suárez

United States
Head Coach: Bora Milutinovic

Group B

Canada
Head Coach:  Bob Lenarduzzi

Costa Rica
Head Coach:  Álvaro Grant MacDonald

Martinique
Head coach: Raymond Destin

Mexico
Head coach: Miguel Mejía Barón

References

CONCACAF Gold Cup squads